Emil Kukko (14 May 1888, Vaasa – 25 July 1963) was a Finnish track and field athlete who competed in the 1912 Summer Olympics.

In 1912, he finished 18th in the javelin throw competition and 24th in the long jump event. He also participated in the pentathlon competition. Being in twelfth place after four events, he did not start in the 1500 m run.

References

External links
list of Finnish athletes

1888 births
1963 deaths
Sportspeople from Vaasa
People from Vaasa Province (Grand Duchy of Finland)
Finnish male javelin throwers
Finnish male long jumpers
Finnish pentathletes
Olympic athletes of Finland
Athletes (track and field) at the 1912 Summer Olympics
19th-century Finnish people
20th-century Finnish people